Springville Township may refer to:

 Springville Township, Wexford County, Michigan
 Springville Township, Susquehanna County, Pennsylvania

See also

Springville (disambiguation)

Township name disambiguation pages